David Nadler may refer to:

 David Nadler (mathematician) (born 1973), American mathematician
 David A. Nadler (1948–2015), American organizational theorist